Nosmo King may refer to several entertainment personalities, based on the term "No smoking":
Nosmo King (album), by John Abercrombie and Andy LaVerne
 Character name of H. Vernon Watson (1886–1952), English variety artist, who used the name from the early 1930s to his death
 Alter ego of Paul Shannon (1909–1990), American radio announcer
 Stage name of Stephen Jameson (born 1949), who later led The Javells, a British Northern soul group